The 1912 Louisville Cardinals football team, commonly known in 1912 as the "Red and Black", was an American football team that represented the University of Louisville in the Kentucky Intercollegiate Athletic Association (KIAA) during the 1912 college football season. In the school's first season of intercollegiate football, the Cardinals were led by head coach Lester Larson and compiled a 5–1 record.  The team played its home games at High School Park in Louisville, Kentucky.

Schedule

References

Louisville
Louisville Cardinals football seasons
Louisville Cardinals football